The 2013 World Single Distance Speed Skating Championships took place between 21 and 24 March 2013 in the Adler Arena, Sochi, Russia. It was a test event for the 2014 Olympic Games.

Schedule

Source: schaatsen.nl& ISU.org

Medal summary

Men's events

Source: ISU

Women's events

Source: ISU

Medal table

References

 
2013 Single Distance
2013 in speed skating
World Single Distance, 2013
Sports competitions in Sochi
2013 in Russian sport
World Single Distance Speed Skating Championships
21st century in Sochi
Speed Skating